Zhaodun Township is a township under the administration of Zhuanglang County, Gansu, China. , it has thirteen villages under its administration:
Zhaodun Village
Dazhuang Village
Jinggou Village
Yangchuan Village
Sunmiao Village
Jiaosi Village
Jiaozhang Village
Liwan Village
Peipu Village
Shizui Village
Guandao Village
Wangpu Village
Mudan Village

References 

Township-level divisions of Gansu
Zhuanglang County